Simplicius may refer to:

 Persons
 Pope Simplicius (d. 483 AD)
 Simplicius of Cilicia (d. c. 560 AD), philosopher
 Saint Simplicius, legendary 'founding' bishop of the Sardinian Diocese of Civita
 Simplicius, Constantius and Victorinus (fl. 2nd century), Roman martyrs and saints
 Simplicius, Faustinus and Beatrix (d. 302 or 303 AD), Roman martyrs and saints

 Art and fiction
 Simplicius Simplicissimus, a picaresque novel about the character of the same name
 Simplicius (operetta), an operetta by Johann Strauss II
 A character in Dialogue Concerning the Two Chief World Systems, a 1632 work by Galileo